A grafter, or grafting knife, is a garden tool used for grafting fruit trees. The grafter is usually in the form of a small knife made of thin metal. It allows for an incision to be made on the branches or trunk of the rootstock for the insertion of the graft.

Gardening tools